The Castle of Montemor-o-Velho is a Portuguese castle in the civil parish of Montemor-o-Velho e Gatões, municipality of Montemor-o-Velho, district of Coimbra.

It has been listed as a national monument since 1910.  It is older than Portugal's nationality (1139).

Since 2014, the castle hosts the Festival Forte which is an electronic music festival set in August.

External links
Montemor-o-Velho Castle at IPPAR 

Montemor-o-Velho
Montemor-o-Velho
Buildings and structures in Montemor-o-Velho
National monuments in Coimbra District